Ahmed Mohamed Reda (born 9 November 1939) is an Egyptian footballer. He competed in the men's tournament at the 1964 Summer Olympics.

References

1939 births
Living people
Egyptian footballers
Egypt international footballers
Olympic footballers of Egypt
Footballers at the 1964 Summer Olympics
Footballers from Cairo
Association footballers not categorized by position
20th-century Egyptian people